Hillary Jordan is an American novelist. She grew up in Dallas and Muskogee, Oklahoma and now lives in Brooklyn. She received a BA from Wellesley College and an MFA in Creative Writing from Columbia University. and has written two novels: Mudbound (2008) and When She Woke (2011), and a short story called "Aftermirth". She is currently working on a sequel to Mudbound. She is a 2009 recipient of the Alex Awards.

Mudbound

Mudbound confronts racism on a cotton farm on the Mississippi Delta in 1946. It won the 2006 Bellwether Prize for fiction, awarded biennially to an unpublished work of fiction that addresses issues of social justice, and a 2009 Alex Award from the American Library Association. It was the 2008 NAIBA (New Atlantic Independent Booksellers Association) Fiction Book of the Year and was named one of the Top Ten Debut Novels of the Decade by "Paste" Magazine. An award-winning film adaptation was released in 2017.

When She Woke

When She Woke is a dystopian reimagining of Nathaniel Hawthorne's The Scarlet Letter, set in a future theocratic America where criminals are punished by being "chromed" – having their skin color genetically altered to fit their crime – and released into the general population to survive as best they can.

Works
 
 
 
27 Authors. 27 Stories. No Names Attached.  Featuring Robert Olen Butler, Catherine Chung, Trent Dalton, Heidi W. Durrow, Tony Eprile, Louise Erdrich, Jamie Ford, Julia Glass, Peter Godwin, Hillary Jordan, Rebecca Makkai, Valerie Martin, Dina Nayeri, Chigozie Obioma, Téa Obreht, Helen Oyeyemi, Mary-Louise Parker, Victoria Redel, Jason Reynolds, S.J. Rozan, Meredith Talusan, Cheryl Lu-Lien Tan, Souvankham Thammavongsa, Jeet Thayil, Paul Theroux, Luis Alberto Urrea, and Edmund White

References

External links
Hillary Jordan website
Hillary Jordan interview September 2010

Columbia University School of the Arts alumni
Wellesley College alumni
21st-century American novelists
Writers from Dallas
Writers from Muskogee, Oklahoma
Living people
American women novelists
21st-century American women writers
Novelists from Texas
Novelists from Oklahoma
Year of birth missing (living people)